The Uttarakhand football team is an Indian football team representing Uttarakhand in the Santosh Trophy.

Current squad
The following 22 players were called up for the 2022–23 Santosh Trophy.

Competitive record

See also
India national football team
Uttarakhand State Football Association
Uttarakhand Super League
Football in India
Uttarakhand cricket team

References

Santosh Trophy teams
Football in Uttarakhand
Football clubs in Uttarakhand
2004 establishments in Uttarakhand
Association football clubs established in 2004